Butlertown is an unincorporated community and census-designated place in Kent County, Maryland, United States. Per the 2020 census, the population was 520.

Demographics

2020 census

Note: the US Census treats Hispanic/Latino as an ethnic category. This table excludes Latinos from the racial categories and assigns them to a separate category. Hispanics/Latinos can be of any race.

History
Formed sometime after 1877

Education
Butlertown is in the Kent County Public Schools district.

Kent County High School is in the CDP although it has a Worton postal address. Kent County Middle School is in Chestertown.

Worton Elementary School was formerly in the CDP, with a Worton postal address. In 2017 the school board voted to close Worton Elementary School, with four members favoring and one against.

References

Census-designated places in Kent County, Maryland
Census-designated places in Maryland